Pomona is a rural town and locality in the Shire of Noosa, Queensland, Australia. In the  the locality of Pomona had a population of 2,910 people. Pomona is located around 135 kilometres north of Brisbane.  It is located at the base of Mount Cooroora (439 meters) at the northern end of the Sunshine Coast.

Geography 
The locality of Pomona is bounded to the south by the Bruce Highway and along most of its northern boundary by Six Mile Creek.

The North Coast railway line passes through the locality from the south-east to the north-west, with the town served by the Pomona railway station. Yurol railway station is an abandoned railway station on the line.

The township of Pomona is surrounded by rural residential acreage properties and small farms. A significant portion of the locality is within Yurol State Forest, a legacy of days past when the town once was a centre of forestry activities. The forest is now preserved as koala habitat.

It is a high intrusive volcanic plug within the Tuchekoi National Park. The surrounding area is of high importance to Aboriginal people and there are many sites of Indigenous cultural importance across the region. Mount Cooroora has significant landscape, social and economic values to the town, while its vertical columns are an attraction to geologists. It is a popular site in the cooler months for visiting tourists climbing to the summit to appreciate excellent views looking east to the Sunshine Coast and west into the Mary Valley. Hikers, horse riders and mountain bike riders use the excellent trail network at its base.

Pomona is within the Noosa Biosphere recognised by the United Nations Economic, Scientific and Cultural Organization (UNESCO) in 2007 as a World Biosphere Reserve.

History

Pomona was first settled by Europeans in the late 1880s, but had been home to the Kabi Kabi/Gubbi Gubbi indigenous peoples for thousands of years before that.

Early settlers collected timber from the area. The railway to Pomona commenced operation in 1891, opening the land to farming.

Pinbarren Provisional School opened on 1 August 1897 and was originally located on Reserve Street near the business centre of the town, in what is now called Stan Topper Park. On 1 January 1909 it became Pomona State School. From 1945 the school included a secondary department (Grades 8-10). In 1976 the school was relocated to Station Street.

The town and railway station were originally called Pinbarren in 1899, then renamed Curara, and renamed Pomona in 1900, after the Roman goddess of fruit and orchards.

Many of the town streets were named after the functions of buildings located along them including Ambulance Street, Church Street, School Street, Rectory Street, Hospital Street, Pottery Street and Factory Street.

The early colonial dairy industry at Pomona was replaced by a patchwork of small cropping farms.

The town became the administrative centre of the Noosa Shire Council when it was established in 1910. However, on 1 December 1980 the Council chambers moved to Tewantin. The original headquarters for the Shire, which were constructed in 1911, are now used by the Cooroora Historical Society and Noosa Shire Museum. The main streets of the town were devastated by fires in 1939 and 1942. Many buildings were re-constructed with brick or in the "Art Deco" architectural style of the era. Colonial buildings are also a feature of the town and can be viewed along a signed history walk.

The state electoral district to which Pomona was part of from 1912 until 1992 was named Cooroora. The seat was renamed Noosa following the 1991 electoral district's re-shuffle. Pomona is in the Wide Bay federal electoral division.

Pomona Methodist Church opened on 26 March 1921 by the Reverend Henry Youngman. In 1925, the Methodist Church building at Kareewa was relocated to behind the Pomona Methodist Church to be used as the church hall. In 1977 the Methodist Church amalgamated into the Uniting Church in Australia and the church in Pomona became the Pomona Uniting Church.

On Sunday 30 March 1949 Archbishop James Duhig laid the foundation stone for St Patrick's Catholic Primary School. Duhig returned on Sunday 30 November 1947 to bless and open the school, which was operated by the Presentation Sisters. The school closed in 1971.

In 1996 the Pomona State School's secondary department moved to Summit Road, where it was renamed Cooroora Secondary College in 1997. In 2007 it was amalgamated with the Noosa District State High School in Cooroy to create a two-campus school with the junior secondary school being conducted on the Pomona campus and the senior secondary school on the Cooroy campus.

Pinbarren Community Christian College opened on 10 February 2003.

Historically and currently Pomona is within local government area of Shire of Noosa, but between 2008 and 2013 it was within Sunshine Coast Region.

At the  Pomona had a population of 2,587 people, growing to 2910 in 2016.

In the  the locality of Pomona had a population of 2,910 people.

The 2022 South East Queensland flood saw significant flooding around Pomona. 450mm of rainfall was recorded from 24–25 February, the second-highest in the state; it reached 786mm later on 25 February, and more than 1,000mm by 26 February.

Heritage listings 
Pomona is Noosa Shire's 'living heritage town'. It has a number of heritage-listed sites, including:

 3 Factory Street: Majestic Theatre
 29 Factory Street: Former Noosa Shire Council building, now Noosa Shire Museum
 Red Street: Courthouse & former Pomona Police Station, Residence & Lockup
 9 Station Street: Cooroora Masonic Temple

Economy 
Pomona is a service centre for a town and regional population of 8000 people. The largest employer in Pomona is Pages Furniture Factory, which celebrated 100 years in business in 2019. Noosa Landcare is the second largest employer. Some farms produce edible goods for South-East Asia markets. To promote rural-based tourism, Noosa Council and Tourism Noosa have devised a 'Noosa Country Drive' through the picturesque rolling countryside and small hinterland towns, including Pomona. The town is seeking to diversify its economy further through adventure and recreational tourism, utilizing the surrounding national parks, forests and trail network. The 50 km2 Lake Cootharaba and Noosa Everglades are a 20-minute drive away.

Hinterland agri-business is fostered by Country Noosa, whose aim is to promote sustainable agriculture, horticulture and other rural enterprises in the area.

As lifestyle industries continue to establish and flourish, a gin-making facility has opened in the town. Pomona hopes to grow as a centre for mountain biking, along the trails surrounding Mt Cooroora, which lies a short walk from the business centre. Tourism Noosa, Noosa Council and Noosa and District Landcare have cooperated to prepare a Noosa Trail Network Master Plan, which will guide associated tourism-related initiatives. Its preparation has been funded by the Noosa Biosphere Reserve Foundation.

Education
Pomona State School is a government primary (Prep-6) school for boys and girls at 74 Station Street. In 2018, the school had an enrolment of 303 students with 25 teachers (20 full-time equivalent) and 15 non-teaching staff (10 full-time equivalent).

Noosa District State High School is a government secondary (7-12) school for boys and girls with two campuses, one at 120 Summit Road, Pomona, for Years 7-8 and the other at Tulip Street in Cooroy for Years 9-12. In 2016, the school had a total enrolment of 1,335 students with 111 teachers (106 full-time equivalent) and 48 non-teaching staff (40 full-time equivalent).

Amenities
The Shire of Noosa operates a library service on a weekly schedule at the corner of Reserve Street and Memorial Avenue.

There is a community swimming pool at the primary school, squash and tennis courts, a lawn bowls club and a full range of retail facilities in town, including a chemist. Ambulance and fire stations sit adjacent to each other at the centre of town.

Cooroy Pomona Uniting Church is at 27 Factory Street.

Events 

The 100 km Noosa Trail Network of walking tracks through the surrounding forests, farmlands and villages is popular with visitors, but especially every second October when the Great Noosa Trail Walk is held. Visitors may also walk to the top of Mount Cooroora, the solidified lava plug of an ancient volcano worn away over time.  Every July, thousands of people cheer 100 runners who race to the top of the mountain and back in under 30 minutes in the annual King of the Mountain. In the past, those not fit enough to race up the mountain participated in 'billy cart' races or the world thong throwing championships (thongs of the footwear variety) with the rules stating that a size 10 thong, or larger, was required.  As at 2010, the record throw was 42.8 meters.

The district's rural roots are celebrated every September with the staging of the annual "show" (county fair).  The Noosa Country Show has been a local institution since 1909.

Local food and craft markets are held every Saturday morning. Every month, environmentally aware enthusiasts collect and distribute seeds of native plants. A weekly swap of home-grown food is another activity enthusiastically embraced, as is permaculture.

Attractions 
Pomona is notable for three things: a relaxed streetscape of distinctive timber and art deco buildings, the heritage-listed Majestic Theatre and the annual King of the Mountain race up the nearby Mount Cooroora. The Majestic, built in 1921, is claimed to be the world's oldest continuously operating silent movie theatre built for that purpose. However, it is not the first theatre in the world in which silent films were screened. The Majestic has been a community-owned enterprise since October 2006.

Australian musician Darren Hanlon's album "Fingertips and Mountaintops" was entirely recorded in the Majestic Theatre.

The Noosa Shire Museum contains objects, photographs and historic documents that explain much of the early history of the area. It is also a Keeping Place of indigenous sacred objects. The old Pomona Railway Station has been moved to the other side of the railway tracks to become the Railway Station Art Gallery.

See also

 List of twin towns and sister cities in Oceania

References

Further reading

External links 

University of Queensland: Queensland Places:Pomona
Majestic Theatre home page

Geographical points of interest 
 Former Pomona Hospital
 Pomona Post Office
 Former ANZ Bank
 Former Pomona State School location, Current Pomona Kindergarten and main town park
 Soldiers Memorial Park & King George V Memorial
 Former Railway Hotel location
 Pomona Hotel

 
Suburbs of Noosa Shire, Queensland
Populated places established in 1890
1890 establishments in Australia
Towns in Queensland
Localities in Queensland